Daniel Parker (born 25 May 1974) is an Australian rules footballer who played for the Fremantle Dockers between 1996 and 1999. He was drafted from Subiaco in the WAFL as a predraft selection in the 1995 AFL Draft and played mainly as a key position player.

The much taller brother of Fremantle games record holder Shane Parker, Daniel struggled to hold his position in the side.  His 25 games at the club over 4 seasons saw him play both in the forward and backlines, but inconsistent form saw him delisted at the end of the 1999 season.

Daniel Parker is a teacher at St Stephen's School, Duncraig.

External links

1974 births
Fremantle Football Club players
Subiaco Football Club players
Living people
Australian rules footballers from Western Australia